James Colville may refer to:

James Colville (footballer), played for Newton Heath during the 1892–93 season, for Anne Bank and Fairfield Athletic
James Colville (judge) (died 1540), Scottish administrator, lord of session and diplomat
James Colville, 1st Lord Colville of Culross (1551–1629), Scottish soldier and courtier
James William Colvile (1810–1880), British lawyer, civil servant and judge